Lost Springs may refer to:

Places
United States
 Lost Springs, Kansas
 Lost Springs, Wyoming

In entertainment
 Stolen Spring (film), 1993 Danish film sometimes referred to as The Lost Spring
 Lost Spring, a 1967 Japanese drama film